Naan Avanillai may refer to the following Indian Tamil language films:

Naan Avanillai (1974 film), directed by K. Balachander
Naan Avanillai (2007 film), a remake of the 1974 film directed by Selva
Naan Avanillai 2, a sequel to Naan Avanillai (2007) directed by Selva